"High Enough" is a song by American supergroup Damn Yankees from their self titled debut album. A power ballad, it is their most successful single in terms of chart position and sales, rising to  3 on the US Billboard Hot 100 chart, the group's first (and only) top-ten pop single. It also reached No. 2 on the US Mainstream Rock Tracks chart. The success of "High Enough" helped send its parent album into the top 20 on the US albums chart.

Background
According to songwriter and co-lead vocalist Jack Blades:

Music video
The music video was filmed on location in River Ridge, Louisiana, and depicts a young drifter and his girlfriend who commit a series of robberies. However, their last one appears to have far more serious consequences as they become the targets of a manhunt by the local police. It is implied, but not specifically shown, that the drifter may have committed murder. The girlfriend is captured, but the drifter escapes and is cornered in his home by the police, who shoot the house full of bullets. The police invade the house, but the drifter's fate is unclear (possibly died during the gunfire). The girlfriend is given the death penalty and at the video's slowing end is being read her last rites by a priest while she is being led out of her cell to the execution chamber. As the video ends, the priest is revealed to be the perpetually-gum-chewing Ted Nugent.

Personnel
Damn Yankees
 Tommy Shaw: Lead and backing vocals, acoustic and rhythm guitar
 Ted Nugent: Lead guitar, backing and harmony vocals
 Jack Blades: Lead and backing vocals, bass
 Michael Cartellone: Drums, percussion

Additional personnel
 Alan Pasqua: Keyboards
 Jimmie Haskell: String Arrangements
 Neverleave Brothers: Backing Vocals

Charts

Weekly charts

Year-end charts

Certifications

References

Damn Yankees (band) songs
1990 singles
1990 songs
1990s ballads
Glam metal ballads
Song recordings produced by Ron Nevison
Songs written by Ted Nugent
Songs written by Jack Blades
Songs written by Tommy Shaw
Warner Records singles